Jerri Lynn Manthey (born September 5, 1970) is an American actress and television personality. She was a contestant in Survivor: The Australian Outback, where she placed 8th, All-Stars, where she placed 10th and Heroes vs. Villains, where she placed 4th, giving Manthey her highest ranked finish during her time on the show.

Early life 
Jerri Manthey was born in Stuttgart, West Germany to American parents and attended both high school and college in Germany. Manthey's father, Cyril, was a career member of the United States Army and served several years in Germany. In 1991, Manthey worked for Hooters at their Huntsville, Alabama restaurant before moving to their restaurant in Oklahoma City. She later appeared in the Summer 1992 edition of Hooters magazine with country singer Vince Gill. Manthey worked as a bartender in Los Angeles while attempting to build an acting career. In the mid 1990s, Jerri appeared in a music video for the Def Leppard hit song “When Love & Hate Collide”. She also appeared in a music video for Faith Hill's cover of "Piece of My Heart".

Reality television 
In 2001, Manthey appeared on the television reality show Survivor: The Australian Outback. She was frequently involved in conflicts with the rest of the cast, earning her a degree of notoriety. Following her appearance on Survivor, Manthey appeared on the reality shows Blind Date, The Surreal Life and The Joe Schmo Show. Manthey also appeared in the 2004 series Survivor: All-Stars and in the 20th season of the show Survivor: Heroes vs. Villains as part of the Villains tribe originally, surviving until the merge and becoming a member of the Yin Yang tribe. She finished in fourth place after being the seventeenth person eliminated from the game on Day 38 and being the ninth and final member of the jury.

Modeling 
Manthey posed nude in the September 2001 issue of Playboy.

2010 removal from air flight 
On March 3, 2010, while Survivor: Heroes vs. Villains was still being aired, Manthey was removed from a US Airways flight in Charlotte, North Carolina after a disagreement with the flight crew. She posted an open letter to US Airways management on her Facebook page sharing the details of her experience.

Filmography

Television

References

External links 
 
 
 Jerri Manthey biography for Survivor: The Australian Outback at CBS.com
 Jerri Manthey biography for Survivor: All-Stars at CBS.com
 Jerri Manthey biography for Survivor: Heroes vs. Villains at CBS.com

1970 births
Living people
American television actresses
American film actresses
German television actresses
German film actresses
German people of American descent
Survivor (American TV series) contestants